Prologis, Inc. is a real estate investment trust headquartered in San Francisco, California that invests in logistics facilities. The company was formed through the merger of AMB Property Corporation and Prologis in June 2011, which made Prologis the largest industrial real estate company in the world. As of December 2022, the company owned 5,495 buildings comprising about 1.2 billion square feet in 19 countries across North America, Latin America, Europe, and Asia. According to The Economist, its business strategy is focused on warehouses that are located close to huge urban areas where land is scarce. It serves about 6,600 tenants. Prologis began to expand its non-real estate business, Essentials, in 2022, offering customers solar power, racking systems, forklifts, generators, and EV charging infrastructure. and other logistics tech equipment for purchase.

History
Prologis was formed in 2011 through the merger of AMB and ProLogis, both multinational real estate companies based in the United States.

1983 founding and early history
In 1983, Hamid Moghadam and Doug Abbey used a $50,000 line of credit to found Abbey, Moghadam and Company, an investment manager serving institutions. They were joined by T. Robert Burke in 1984 and established AMB Property Corporation, which invested in office, industrial and community shopping centers on behalf of large institutional investors. During the savings and loan crisis, the company avoided significant financial repercussions by investing in industrial parks and shopping centers, and began to exit the office market in 1987. AMB launched its first private equity fund in 1989, which focused on industrial and retail properties.

In late 1997, AMB became a public company via an initial public offering, with more than US$2.8 billion under management.

In 1999, the company sold its retail business to focus solely on the industrial sector. The company made its first overseas investment in 2002, developing a facility for Procter & Gamble. That year, AMB initiated an international expansion program focused on buying and developing distribution facilities near global trade hubs, particularly in growth markets such as Brazil, Mexico, and China. AMB added an internal development division in 2004. By 2011, AMB was focusing on expanding its operations in China and Brazil.

Security Capital Industrial Trust (SCI), a legacy company to Prologis, was formed in 1991. SCI became a public company via an initial public offering on the New York Stock Exchange in 1994. The company first expanded outside the United States in 1996 with acquisitions in Mexico and in 1997 it acquired properties in both Mexico and Europe. SCI invested in the Netherlands in the summer of 1997 and then expanded into Paris, Stockholm, Brussels, Warsaw, London, Berlin, Milan, and Madrid. SCI purchased 33% of Insight Inc. in October 1997 to help solve supply-chain problems for clients. SCI also expanded into the refrigerated distribution business in 1997, purchasing Christian Salvesen and renaming it as CS Integrated LLC. SCI acquired Texas Cold Storage and Continental Freezer in 1997 and secured the primary contract to distribute food for Kroger Co. in Illinois. For refrigeration abroad, SCI purchased Frigoscandia AB, then Europe's largest distributor of refrigerated goods. SCI later exited the cold-storage business.

1997 incorporation and international expansion
Prologis, Inc. was incorporated on November 24, 1997. SCI officially changed its name to ProLogis in July 1998. SCI was active in 84 markets in 12 countries by July 1998, with a market capitalization of nearly $5 billion. In November 1998, Prologis Trust acquired Meridian Industrial Trust for $862.5 million in stock. At the time, Prologis was the "largest owner of industrial and warehouse properties in the United States." ProLogis formed its first property funds in 1999, and entered the Japanese market in 2001. In 2003, ProLogis was added to the S&P 500 Index and entered the Chinese market, and in 2004 the company acquired Keystone Industrial Trust for $1.6 billion. In the same year, ProLogis formed its first joint venture in China with Suzhou Logistics Center Co. Ltd. With headquarters in Aurora, Colorado, at the time, in 2005 ProLogis completed a merger with Catellus Development Corporation, a North American industrial development company, for $4.9 billion. ProLogis ranked first in the 2005 Top 25 Industrial Owners survey. The company acquired Catellus Development in 2005 for $3.6 billion. In 2006, ProLogis became a Fortune 1000 company and the ProLogis European Properties Fund became a public company.

In the midst of problems with debt following aggressive expansion and heavy borrowing, ProLogis' CEO Jeffrey Schwartz was replaced with Walter Rakowich in 2008. Rakowich afterwards implemented a cost-cutting effort involving raising capital and selling assets. In December 2008, ProLogis sold a portfolio of assets to the Government of Singapore Investment Corporation, which subsequently transformed the assets into Global Logistic Properties.

It sold its China operations and some of its Japanese interests to GIC Private Limited for $1.3 billion in 2009.

In August 2009, ProLogis secured financing from Deutsche Pfandbriefbank and an unidentified German bank for two of its funds.

The Blackstone Group bought a portfolio of assets from the company in late 2010 for $1 billion. In January 2011, the company sold a portfolio of Catellus retail and mixed-use assets to affiliates of TPG Capital for $505 million, including rights to the Catellus name.

2011 merger to present
In March 2011, prior to the merger with ProLogis, AMB Property formed a €470 million joint venture with Allianz Real Estate.

In January 2011, AMB Property Corporation agreed to buy the larger ProLogis for $8.7 billion, with the new entity named Prologis. The companies announced that the new Prologis would be based in San Francisco, AMB's hometown, but would maintain an office in Denver, Colorado, where ProLogis was based. Completed in June 2011, the merger  was one of the biggest real-estate deals since the Great Recession, and it created the largest industrial real estate company in the world. With total market value estimated at $24 billion, the new Prologis had around $46 billion in assets under management and logistics and distribution facilities in North America, Europe, Asia and South America. Clients of the new company included DHL, Kuehne + Nagel, Home Depot Inc., Unilever, and FedEx. AMB CEO Hamid R. Moghadam and ProLogis CEO Walter Rakowich were appointed as the new company's co-chiefs, with Moghadam to become the sole CEO in 2013.

In August 2011, the company sold a 378,298-square-foot industrial property in Grove City, Ohio for $12.4 million. The company also acquired a warehouse in Tolleson, Arizona for $9.95 million.

In February 2012, the company sold a 3.5 million square foot portfolio in the United Kingdom to The Blackstone Group for $335 million. The company sold the 10 buildings in Memphis, Tennessee in June 2012. In November 2012, the company sold a 1.98 million square portfolio in  Minneapolis–Saint Paul for $96.6 million.

On February 14, 2013, Nippon Prologis REIT, Inc. (NPR), a Japanese real estate investment trust formed by Prologis, successfully completed an IPO on the Tokyo Stock Exchange. In March 2013, Prologis formed the Prologis European Logistics Partners Sarl joint venture with Norges Bank Investment Management for US$3.1 billion. In August 2013, in partnership with The Blackstone Group the company acquired a 17 million square foot portfolio for $960 million from Lehman Brothers. In the fourth quarter of 2013, the company sold 3 warehouses in Tempe, Arizona for $22 million, and acquired a 1.8 million square foot portfolio in Nashville, Tennessee. In November 2013, Prologis announced plans to spend "as much as $600 million a year to develop warehouses in Japan," its biggest market after the United States, where it had customers such as Amazon.com and Nippon Express.

In 2014, the company acquired a 117,600 square foot warehouse in Hanover, Maryland for $8.65 million. and two industrial buildings in Charlotte, North Carolina for $17.5 million. The company also completed the corporate spin-off of FIBRA Prologis, the company's Mexican affiliate also known as Prologis Property Mexico SA, raising about 7 billion pesos ($541 million). Prologis sold a 59-property portfolio to TPG for $375 million. In September 2014, the company sold a former Big Lots warehouse in Columbus, Ohio for $8.5 million. At the end of 2014, Prologis owned 2,853 properties, with the bulk in North America and around 600 in Europe and Asia.

In March 2015, the company acquired an 18-acre development site in La Vergne, Tennessee for $2.35 million.

Prologis had reduced its number of managed funds from 23 to 11 by the spring of 2015, and was managing "$29 billion in real-estate assets through joint ventures and a series of funds backed by institutional investors." That quarter, the company sold a Silicon Valley industrial park to Facebook, Inc.

With corporate headquarters remaining in San Francisco, in April 2015 Prologis announced a plan to move offices from east Denver, Colorado, to a new building in downtown Denver in 2017.

In June 2015, Prologis partnered with Norges Bank Investment Management to buy KTR Capital Partners for $5.9 billion, expanding Prologis' real estate portfolio in the United States through the Prologis U.S. Logistics Venture.

In October 2015, Prologis acquired Morris Realty Associates' portfolio of logistics and retail properties in the United States for $820 million. Prologis sold the retail asset portion of this portfolio to an affiliate of The Blackstone Group for $374 million.

Prologis formed its venture capital arm in March 2016 and had made 20 investments by late 2019. By late 2016, Prologis had built large multistory warehouses in Japan, Singapore and China. The company began construction on a three-floor warehouse in Seattle, Washington, in November 2016, which was the first multi-story warehouse in the country. The following month, Prologis also outlined plans to build a three-story warehouse in San Francisco.

In 2016, the company acquired 40 acres in Denver, and sold an 800,000 square foot distribution center in Etna Township, Licking County, Ohio leased to Amazon.com for $89 million. In December 2016, Prologis received two 2016 Eurobuild CEE Awards.

In November 2017, the company sold a 12-building business park in Fremont, California for $72 million.

In August 2018, the company acquired DCT Industrial Trust. It sold the last of its holdings in Memphis, Tennessee, and acquired the Pepsi bottling plant near the Mount Baker station in Seattle for $65 million in September of that year.

In November 2019, the company acquired land in Polk County, Florida for $10 million for a warehouse to be leased to Amazon.com.

It acquired Liberty Property Trust in January 2020.

In February 2020, the company acquired Industrial Property Trust. The company also acquired a development site in Miami Dade for $9 million. At that point, The Economist noted that Prologis' business strategy was focused on warehouses that are located close to huge urban areas where land is scarce. Prologis began releasing a series of special reports on the industrial impact of the COVID-19 pandemic in early 2020, noting that an increase an e-commerce would likely result in companies increasing their inventories, in turn increasing the demand for warehousing.

In April 2021, the company acquired Hilltop Mall in Richmond, California for $117 million.

In June 2022, the company acquired the land below California's Great America in Santa Clara, California from Cedar Fair, which leased the land back with plans to close the amusement park by 2033.

In October 2022, the company acquired Duke Realty.

Market research
Since 2016, the company has published white papers and its own market research, including the quarterly Industrial Business Indicator and the annual Prologis Logistics Rent Index. The company also began releasing a series of special reports on the industrial impact of the COVID-19 pandemic in early 2020.

In September 2017, in partnership with Oxford Economic Papers, the company determined that $1.3 trillion-worth of goods were transferred through its buildings annually and that the company and its customers had a total annual economic impact of $200 billion. The study was updated in December 2022, reporting a 23% increase over 2020, with $2.7 trillion of goods either produced or sold worldwide passing through Prologis facilities, representing 2.8% of the global GDP with an economic impact of $300 billion.

References

External links
 

1997 initial public offerings
American companies established in 1983
Companies based in San Francisco
Companies listed on the New York Stock Exchange
Financial services companies established in 1983
Real estate companies established in 1983
Real estate investment trusts of the United States